Maximilian Janke (born 28 February 1993) is a German handball player for SC DHfK Leipzig and the German national team.

He participated at the 2018 European Men's Handball Championship.

References

1993 births
Living people
German male handball players